Galium palustre, the common marsh bedstraw or simply marsh-bedstraw, is a herbaceous annual plant of the family Rubiaceae. This plant is widely distributed, native to virtually every country in Europe, plus Morocco, the Azores, Turkey, Turkmenistan, Western Siberia, Greenland, eastern Canada, St. Pierre & Miquelon, and parts of the United States (primarily the Michigan and the Northeast, but with isolated populations in Tennessee, Montana, Washington and Oregon). The species is classified as a noxious weed in New York, Pennsylvania, Massachusetts, Connecticut, Vermont and New Hampshire. It is considered naturalized in Kamchatka, Australia, New Zealand and Argentina.

Ecology
In Britain, Galium palustre is part of the British NVC Community M23 (Juncus effusus/acutiflorus – Galium palustre rush-pasture).  It is a component of Purple moor grass and rush pastures - a type of Biodiversity Action Plan habitat in the UK. It occurs on poorly drained neutral and acidic soils of the lowlands and upland fringe. It is found in the South West of England, especially in Devon.

Gallery

References

External links

Emorsgate Seeds (King's Lynn, Norfolk UK), Marsh Bedstraw
Tela Botanica, Gaillet des marais
Wisconsin Department of Natural Resources
Wilde Planten in Nederland en Belgie, Moeraswalstro
Naturespot, recording the wildlife of Leicestershire & Rutland, marsh-bedstraw
Flora-on Portugal
Flore-alpes, Gaillet chétif
 
New Zealand Plant Conservation Network
Plant Identification United Kingdom, West Highland Flora, Marsh-bedstraw
Flora Emslandia, Pflanzen im Emsland (plants in northwestern Germany), Sumpf-Labkraut, Galium palustre

palustre
Flora of Europe
Flora of the Northeastern United States
Flora of Eastern Canada
Flora of Subarctic America
Flora of Morocco
Flora of the Azores
Flora of Turkey
Flora of Turkmenistan
Flora of Siberia
Flora of Manitoba
Flora of Montana
Plants described in 1753
Taxa named by Carl Linnaeus
Flora without expected TNC conservation status